Victor Quesada (born in Ibagué, April 28, 1985) is a Colombian theatre director, playwright and writer.

Life
He was educated at the Pontifical Javeriana University of Bogotà, Colombia, where he got a bachelor's degree in Political Science in 2007, followed by a MA in Theatre Directing at the University of Essex, England, in 2009. 
He attended and did significant work at  GITIS in Moscow and at Odin Teatret in Denmark, he also worked with the Malayerba Group in Ecuador, with the playwright Jô Bilac in Brazil, with Lluis Pasqual in the Lliure in Barcelona and with Miguel de Arco in Kamikaze Producciones in Madrid.

Awards
 the Biennial Award for Artistic Creation Javeriana's University in 2018
 Award for directors with trajectory of IDARTES in 2017
 Residencia en Arte Dramático from IDARTES in 2015
 Impulso Pasantías Internacionales from the Ministry of Culture in 2012
 Jóvenes creadores from the Ministry of Culture of Colombia in 2011
 Jóvenes Talentosfrom in Icetex 2010

Work experience

Directing

 Rojas by Laura Calderón. Seki Sano Theatre. Bogota. March 2019.
 El Perro del Hortelano by Lope de Vega. Colón Theatre. Bogota. December, 2018.
 El puesto by César Betancur produced by Dago García with César Mora. Patria Theatre. Bogota. September, 2018.
 4.48 Psicosis by Sarah Kane. Javeriana's Theatre. Bogota. June, 2018.
 El verbo placer by Flavia Dos Santos and César Betancur. Patria Theater. April, 2018.
 La Noche Árabe by Roland Schimmelpfennig. National Theatre. Bogota. October, 2017.
 Me ericé by César Betancur with Amparo Grisales . Patria Theatre. Bogota. October, 2017.
 Juicio a una Zorra by Miguel del Arco. Sala Uno Theatre. Bogota. May, 2017.
 La piedra oscura by Alberto Conejero. Sala Uno Theatre. Bogota. October, 2016.
 Hay un Complot I-II by César Betancur with Andrea Guzmán. National Theatre. Bogota.March, 2016.
 El inspector by Nikolai Gogol. National Theatre. Bogota. June, 2015.
 Ni muerta dejo de vivir by and with Andrea Guzmán. Bogota. September, 2015.
 El Avaro by Molière with Natalia_Reyes. National Theatre. Bogota. January, 2015
 Cállate y Escribe by César Betancur with Andrea Guzmán. Astor Plaza Theatre. Bogota. December, 2014.
 The Beauty Queen of Leenane by Martin McDonagh. Clifftown Youth Theatre. London. December, 2009

Playwriting and directing

 Las mujeres de Lorca. Julio Mario Santodomingo and Colón Theatre. Bogota. October 2018/March 2019.
 Viva inspired by Pablo Picasso. National Theatre. Co-written with Denise Hergett. Bogota. January, 2018.
 Güerfanitos. National Theatre. Bogota. March, 2015.
 Voz. National Theatre. Bogota. April, 2014.
 Apesta. Site Specific. Bogota. April, 2012.
 Anónimos. Garage Theatre. Bogota. December, 2011.

Screenwriting and directing

 Closures. Short Film. Estudio Babel. 2018.
 El verbo placer. TV Commercial. CARACOL TV. 2018.
 Me ericé. TV Commercial. CARACOL TV. 2017
 Lives in sight. Soap Opera. Chapters: 9, 14, 22, 26, 32, 34, 40, 41 and 47. RCN TV. 2015

Dramatic work published
 Cada primero de Noviembre (Every first of November). Chaos in nine letters. V Dramaturgy Clinic. Editorial UD. . Bogota. April, 2017.
 Apesta (Stink Out). Colombian Theatre Collection Publisher UD. Nº. XLVII. . Bogota. April, 2017.
 Voz (Voice). Contemporary Colombian dramaturgy. Anthology II. Compilation: Marina Lamus. Publisher Paso de Gato. . México. August, 2013.

References

External links

 BWW Interview: Victor Quesada of VIVA at Teatro Nacional La Castellana
  Colombian Theatre Thrives at Iberoamerican Theatre Festival in Bogotá
 Victor Quesada: El joven ibaguereño que está triunfando en las artes escénicas
 Las nuevas estrellas del teatro colombiano
 Comedia y drama por la misma pluma de Víctor Quesada
 La primavera teatral colombiana 
 Victor Quesada, Directores (Teatro)| ColArte | Colombia

1985 births
Living people
Colombian dramatists and playwrights
Male dramatists and playwrights
Colombian male writers
21st-century Colombian writers
21st-century dramatists and playwrights
Colombian theatre directors
Pontifical Xavierian University alumni
People from Ibagué
Alumni of the University of Essex